Continued VFR into IMC is when an aircraft operating under visual flight rules intentionally or unintentionally enters into instrument meteorological conditions. Flying an aircraft without visual reference to the ground can lead to a phenomenon known as spatial disorientation, which can cause the pilot to misperceive the angle, altitude, and speed they are traveling. This is considered a very serious safety hazard in general aviation. According to AOPA’s Nall Report, approximately 4% of general aviation accidents are weather related, yet these accidents account for more than 25% of all fatalities.

Inadvertent entry into Instrument Meteorological Conditions

If weather deteriorates during flight or the aircraft flies into clouds, a flight that started out under VFR may turn into a flight under IMC. This is known as VFR into IMC or Inadvertent Entry Into Instrument Meteorological Conditions (IIMC). IIMC is a dangerous situation that has resulted in many accidents, as pilots may become subject to spatial disorientation without visual cues, leading to loss of control or controlled flight into terrain. Statistics from the Federal Aviation Administration indicate that spatial disorientation is a factor in approximately 15% of general aviation accidents; of those, approximately 90% are fatal. Other statistics indicate that 4% of general aviation accidents were attributable to weather; of those weather-related accidents, 50% resulted from VFR into IMC, and 72% of the VFR into IMC accidents were fatal.

In the 180—Degree Turn Experiment conducted in 1954 by the University of Illinois, twenty student pilots flew from VFR into simulated IMC; after entry, all of them eventually reached a dangerous flight condition or attitude over a period ranging from 20 to 480 seconds. The average time to reach a dangerous condition was 178 seconds, echoed in the title of the "178 Seconds to Live" article distributed by the Federal Aviation Administration in 1993; however, the original 1954 study was noted for simulating an aircraft the subjects had little to no experience with, and only providing a partial instrument panel. In addition, the "178 seconds" average time was extracted from the preliminary evaluation; after training for a standardized procedure to exit IMC, each student pilot was tested three times, and 59 of the 60 resulting simulated flights successfully resulted in a controlled descent out of the cloud deck without reaching a dangerous condition.

Examples of accidents involving continued VFR into IMC 

 The Day the Music Died
 2020 Calabasas helicopter crash

See also

Notes

References

External links 
 

Aviation risks